The Vancouver Foundation is an organization based in Vancouver, British Columbia. It administers over 1,600 funds and assets totalling $930 million, on behalf of individuals, families, corporations and charities.

History 
Vancouver Foundation was founded in 1943 by Alice MacKay. MacKay had saved $1,000 from her secretarial job and wanted to help homeless women trapped in a cycle of poverty.

Whitford Julian VanDusen oversaw the establishment and incorporation of Vancouver Foundation. VanDusen added $10,000 to the endowment and encouraged nine friends to match his own gift. In 1950, the Foundation was incorporated by the Legislature of British Columbia in a Special Act.

Activities 
Vancouver Foundation, in partnership with its donors, has distributed more than $1 billion to community projects and programs. In 2014, Vancouver Foundation and its donors made more than 4,900 grants, and distributions totalling approximately $57 million, to registered charities across Canada.

About 70 percent of grant amounts are received within the Lower Mainland region with the remainder in other parts of the province of British Columbia.

Grant recipients range from social services to medical research groups, to organizations devoted to arts and culture, the environment, education, children and families, youth, and animal welfare.

By 2017, the foundation's grant recipients will be required to release their work under Creative Commons licence, which permits anyone to use the product freely without copyright limitations.

References

External links 
  Information about activities.
Vancouver Foundation Act

1943 establishments in Canada
Community foundations
Foundations based in Canada
Non-profit organizations based in Vancouver